Four Cs may refer to:
 Four Cs (education), a group of learning competencies and skills in 21st century learning 
 Diamond (gemstone), the Four Cs are carat, cut, color, and clarity
 Marketing mix, may refer to two possible marketing-related concepts:
 Four 'C's in ７Cs compass model (Co-marketing)
Four 'C's in consumer-oriented model